Sebastián Báez was the defending champion but chose not to participate.

Daniel Elahi Galán won the title after defeating Santiago Rodríguez Taverna 6–1, 3–6, 6–3 in the final.

Seeds

Draw

Finals

Top half

Bottom half

References

External links
Main draw
Qualifying draw

Challenger Concepción - 1